Pieter Adriaan Cornelis Beelaerts van Blokland (8 December 1932 – 22 September 2021) was a Dutch politician of the Christian Democratic Appeal (CDA). 

He was Minister of Housing, Spatial Planning and the Environment in the First Van Agt cabinet from 1977 to 1981. In 1981, he was an MP. Beelaerts van Blokland was mayor of Wolphaartsdijk, Vianen, Amstelveen, Apeldoorn, and Hengelo. He was also Queen's Commissioner of the Province of Utrecht from 1985 to 1998.

Decorations

References

External links

Official
  Jhr.Drs. P.A.C. (Pieter) Beelaerts van Blokland Parlement & Politiek

 
 

 
 

 
 

 

 
 

 
 

 
 

1932 births
2021 deaths
Christian Democratic Appeal politicians
Christian Historical Union politicians
Delft University of Technology alumni
Dutch corporate directors
Dutch nonprofit executives
Dutch nonprofit directors
Dutch members of the Dutch Reformed Church
Dutch lobbyists
Dutch urban planners
Grand Officers of the Order of Orange-Nassau
Jonkheers of the Netherlands
Knights of the Order of the Netherlands Lion
King's and Queen's Commissioners of Utrecht
Mayors of Amstelveen
Mayors in Gelderland
People from Apeldoorn
Mayors in Overijssel
Mayors in Zeeland
Members of the Provincial Council of South Holland
Members of the Provincial Council of Zeeland
Members of the House of Representatives (Netherlands)
Ministers of Housing and Spatial Planning of the Netherlands
People from Amstelveen
People from Hengelo
People from Vianen
People from Heerjansdam
Protestant Church Christians from the Netherlands
20th-century Dutch businesspeople
20th-century Dutch civil servants
20th-century Dutch politicians